Alexander Rullo (born 15 June 2000) is an Australian racing car driver. He currently drives in the TCR Australia Series for Kelly Racing. He is also co-driving with Simona de Silvestro in the No. 78 Nissan Altima in the Pirtek Enduro Cup.

In February 2017 it was confirmed that Rullo would race in the 2017 Supercars Championship for Lucas Dumbrell Motorsport and become the youngest driver in the championship's history.

Racing career

V8 Touring Car Series
Alex Rullo made his debut in the V8 Touring Car National Series at the age of 14, winning a race in his second event. He managed to win four races out of the 15 contested and finished the season second overall for MW Motorsport.

Super2 Series
Rullo made his Dunlop Series debut for Lucas Dumbrell Motorsport in 2016, driving a Castrol-backed Holden VF Commodore for the full season. Rullo's best race finish was sixth (twice) and he finished 17th in the championship. In 2018 he will drive a Nissan Altima L33 with MW Motorsport.

Supercars Championship
In February 2017, an announcement was made that 16-year-old Rullo was to make his Supercars debut with Lucas Dumbrell Motorsport, the team which he raced with in the Development Series the year prior. Coincidentally, the previous driver to hold the record was Paul Dumbrell, the brother of Lucas, who debuted in 1999. It was reported that Alex would run the number No. 62 in which he had raced since his karting days. Rullo did not qualify for the new-for-2017 CAMS Superlicense, and was given special dispensation to be reviewed on a race-by-race basis.

TCR Australia
In 2019 he raced in the inaugural TCR Australia Touring Car Series for Kelly Racing in a Holden Astra TCR.

Career results

Super2 Series results
(key) (Round results only)

Supercars Championship results

Bathurst 1000 results

References

External links

Profile on V8 Supercars official webpage

Alex Rullo profile on US Racing Reference

Australian racing drivers
Living people
Supercars Championship drivers
2000 births
Australian Endurance Championship drivers
Kelly Racing drivers
Nismo drivers